Holar is a small Marathi community or caste found in Maharashtra, Karnataka Gujarat and Madhya Pradesh the states in India. The caste traditionally provides music and plays at weddings and other festivities.

References

Sources 

Indian castes
Leatherworking castes
Scheduled Castes of Maharashtra
Scheduled Castes of Gujarat
Scheduled Castes of Karnataka
Scheduled Castes of Dadra and Nagar Haveli
Scheduled Castes of Daman and Diu